A Temperley transporter is an early form of overhead crane invented by John Ridley Temperley in 1892.  They were manufactured by the Temperley Transporter Company of London.

Relevant patents
GB0021170 issued in the United Kingdom in 1892

References

Engineering vehicles
Cranes (machines)
Port infrastructure